Mama Married is a 1969 Soviet drama film directed by Vitaly Melnikov.

Plot 
In the life of Zinaida, who single-handedly raised her son, Viktor appeared. However, Boris is not able to immediately understand that his mother also needs personal happiness. Zinaida works at a construction site as a plasterer, she and her son live in a new house on the outskirts of the city, which is being built up with new residential buildings. Boris works as a scooter driver-forwarder, delivers pastries and cookery to shops. Mother and son are generally friendly, the son treats the mother with patronizing humor. He reads a lot, seeks to somehow assert himself in life, having overcome his teenage complexes and envying his school friend, who easily and naturally meets girls on the dance floor. Suddenly, everything turns upside down in the life of a small family: the mother began to meet with Viktor, the grader driver. Their intentions are quite definite   Viktor and Zinaida decided to get married, respectively, they plan to live in the same apartment, which is incredibly annoying and angering Boris, who believes that at their age it is ridiculous to talk about love.

Cast 
 Lyusyena Ovchinnikova  as Zinaida
 Oleg Yefremov as Viktor
 Nikolay Burlyaev as Boris Golubev
 Larisa Burkova as Vera
 Konstantin Tyagunov as Dmitry Petrovich
 Viktor Ilichyov as Leonard
 Lyudmila Arinina as Aunt Katya
 Arkadi Trusov	 as uncle Vanya
 Kira Kreylis-Petrova	 as Lyudmila
 Yevgeniya Vetlova as girl in a cafe; friend of Leonard

References

External links 
 

1969 films
1960s Russian-language films
Soviet drama films
1969 drama films
Lenfilm films
Soviet romantic drama films
Films set in Saint Petersburg